This is a list of episodes of the 2015 Japanese tokusatsu television series Garo: Gold Storm Sho, the direct sequel to 2013's Garo: Yami o Terasu Mono which is itself a spinoff of 2005 & 2006's Garo.

Episodes

References

Gold Storm Sho episodes
Garo Gold Storm Sho